General Abdul Majid Rozi was an Uzbek commander of Arab Descent during the Afghan Civil war. He was allied with the forces of General Abdul Rashid Dostum.

In 1992 Rozi was in charge of the overall command of the forces of Junbish. During the battle of Kabul, Majid Rozi was reportedly profiting from the looting of Kabul by his forces and the forces of General Dostum. He was recalled to Mazar-e Sharif in 1992.

General Majid Rozi, at the time in Baghdis Province was one of the commanders who sided with Abdul Malik when he defected to the Taliban in 1997. He proceeded to arrest Dostum's commanders as well as Ismail Khan who he handed over to the governor of Herat Mullah Abdul Razzaq Akhundzada.

Rozi was also present during the transfer of Taliban prisoners to Sheberghan in which thousands were killed and suffocated in containers.

From 25 November-1 December he was in charge of Dostum's forces at the Battle of Qala-i-Jangi in which approximately 300-400 prisoners were killed.

On 3 February 2002, in the face of escalating conflict in Mazar-e Sharif, Majid Rozi lead a 600-person mixed security force for the city drawn from each of the 5 parties operating in the region, after a United Nations backed agreement. This post will include 240 members of Jamiat-e Islami, 180 members from Junbushi and 180 members from the 3 Hazara parties such as Hezb-e Wahdat.

In 2012, he was an advisor to the Afghan Interior Ministry.

References

Afghan military personnel
Living people
National Islamic Movement of Afghanistan politicians
Afghan Uzbek politicians
Year of birth missing (living people)